The index of physics articles is split into multiple pages due to its size.

To navigate by individual letter use the table of contents below.

W

W' and Z' bosons
W' boson
W. G. Unruh
W. Jason Morgan
W. Lewis Hyde
W. R. Dean
W. W. Hansen
WAMIT
WASH-1400
WASH-740
WAsP
WIMP Argon Programme
WITCH experiment
WKB approximation
WMAP cold spot
WOMBAT (diffractometer)
W and Z bosons
W band
W state
Wade Allison
Wafer (electronics)
Wagner model
Wake
Wake turbulence
Waldo K. Lyon
Wall-plug efficiency
Wallace Clement Sabine
Wallace Hampton Tucker
Wallace Smith Broecker
Walter A. Rosenblith
Walter Dieminger
Walter Dornberger
Walter Dröscher
Walter Eric Spear
Walter Franz
Walter Gear
Walter Gerlach
Walter Gilbert
Walter Gordon (physicist)
Walter Grotrian
Walter Guyton Cady
Walter H. Schottky
Walter Heitler
Walter Herrmann (physicist)
Walter Hoppe
Walter Houser Brattain
Walter Kaufmann (physicist)
Walter Kistler
Walter Kohn
Walter M. Elsasser
Walter Mauderli
Walter Oelert
Walter Rogowski
Walter Rotman
Walter Schottky Prize
Walter Selke
Walter Thirring
Walter Tollmien
Walter Zinn
Walter Zürn
Walter de Heer
Walther Bothe
Walther Kossel
Walther Meissner
Walther Müller
Walther Nernst
Walther Ritz
Wander Johannes de Haas
Wang Ganchang
Wang Zhuxi
Wannier function
Ward Plummer
Wardenclyffe Tower
Ward–Takahashi identity
Warm dark matter
Warm–hot intergalactic medium
Warp drive (Star Trek)
Warped Passages
Warped geometry
Warren J. Smith
Warren Siegel
Washburn's equation
Washburn constant
Washington Large Area Time Coincidence Array
Washout (aviation)
Water content
Water cycle
Water meter
Water pipe percolator
Water potential
Water retention curve
Water thread experiment
Water vapor
Water window
Watercraft
Waterfall plot
Waterhole (radio)
Waterspout
Watson interferometer
Watt
Watt's law
Watt W. Webb
Watt steam engine
Wave
Wave-icle
Wave-making resistance
Wave-piercing
WaveRider
Wave Motion (journal)
Wave action (continuum mechanics)
Wave base
Wave drag
Wave equation
Wave field synthesis
Wave flume
Wave function
Wave function collapse
Wave function renormalization
Wave height
Wave impedance
Wave loading
Wave packet
Wave power
Wave propagation
Wave propagation speed
Wave radar
Wave setup
Wave shoaling
Wave tank
Wave theory of light
Wave turbulence
Wave vector
Waveguide
Waveguide (acoustics)
Waveguide (electromagnetism)
Waveguide (optics)
Waveguiding
Wavelength
Wavenumber
Wavenumber–frequency diagram
Waveplate
Waves and shallow water
Wave–current interaction
Wave–particle duality
Weak-field approximation
Weak focusing
Weak hypercharge
Weak interaction
Weak isospin
Weak isospin projection
Weak localization
Weakless Universe
Weakly guiding fiber
Weakly interacting massive particles
Weapons-grade
Web of Knowledge
Web of Science
Weber (unit)
Weber bar
Weber electrodynamics
Weber number
Wedge (mechanical device)
Wedge filter
Wedge fringe
Wehnelt cylinder
Wei-Tou Ni
Wei Shyy
Weibel instability
Weight
Weighted Voronoi diagram
Weighting curve
Weightlessness
Weinberg angle
Weinberg–Witten theorem
Weinstein conjecture
Weir
Weiss domain
Weiss magneton
Weissenberg effect
Weissenberg number
Welteislehre
Wendell H. Furry
Wendelstein 7-X
Werner Hartmann (physicist)
Werner Heisenberg
Werner Israel
Werner Kolhörster
Werner Kuhn (chemist)
Werner Meyer-Eppler
Werner Rolfinck
Werner state
Wernher von Braun
Werthamer–Helfand–Hohenberg theory
Wesley Huntress
Wess–Zumino gauge
Wess–Zumino model
Wess–Zumino–Witten model
West number
Wet-bulb temperature
Wetted aspect ratio (wing)
Wetting
Wetting transition
Weyl's postulate
Weyl curvature hypothesis
Weyl equation
Weyl notation
Weyl scalar
Weyl tensor
Weyl transformation
What Do You Care What Other People Think?
What Is Life?
What the Bleep Do We Know!?
Wheatstone bridge
Wheel and axle
Wheeler's delayed choice experiment
Wheeler–DeWitt equation
Wheeler–Feynman absorber theory
Whirlpool
Whirlwind (atmospheric phenomenon)
Whispering-gallery wave
Whispering gallery
White dwarf
White hole
White noise
Whitehead's theory of gravitation
Whitham equation
Whole number rule
Wick's theorem
Wick Haxton
Wick rotation
Wide-angle X-ray scattering
Wide-bandgap semiconductors
Wideband materials
Widom scaling
Wiedemann–Franz law
Wien's displacement law
Wien's distribution law
Wien approximation
Wien effect
Wien filter
Wiggler (synchrotron)
Wightman axioms
Wigner's classification
Wigner's friend
Wigner's theorem
Wigner 3-j symbols
Wigner crystal
Wigner effect
Wigner quasiprobability distribution
Wigner–Eckart theorem
Wigner–Seitz cell
Wigner–Seitz radius
Wilbur B. Rayton
Wilfrid Basil Mann
Wilhelm Anderson
Wilhelm Eduard Weber
Wilhelm Hallwachs
Wilhelm Hanle
Wilhelm Holtz
Wilhelm Karl Ritter von Haidinger
Wilhelm Lenz
Wilhelm Nusselt
Wilhelm Orthmann
Wilhelm Röntgen
Wilhelm Walcher
Wilhelm Westphal
Wilhelm Wien
Wilkinson Microwave Anisotropy Probe
Willard Boyle
Willard Harrison Bennett
Willebrord Snellius
Willem 's Gravesande
Willem Hendrik Keesom
Willem Vos
Willem de Sitter
Willi Kalender
William A. Bardeen
William Alfred Fowler
William Allen Zajc
William Allis
William Andrew Goddard III
William Arnold Anthony
William Astbury
William B. Bridges
William B. McLean
William Bassichis
William C. Schwartz
William Coblentz
William Cochran (physicist)
William Crookes
William Curry (oceanographer)
William D. Coolidge
William Daniel Phillips
William Duane (physicist)
William E. Caswell
William E. Forsythe
William E. Gordon
William Eccles (physicist)
William Edward Ayrton
William Fletcher Barrett
William Francis Gray Swann
William Francis Magie
William Frederick Meggers
William Froude
William Fuller Brown, Jr.
William G. Tifft
William Gilbert (astronomer)
William Grylls Adams
William Hallock
William Henry Bragg
William Higinbotham
William Hyde Wollaston
William J. Thaler
William Jackson Humphreys
William John Macquorn Rankine
William Jones (optician)
William Justin Kroll
William L. Burke
William Lawrence Bragg
William M. Hartmann
William McFadden Orr
William Mitchell (physicist)
William Mitchinson Hicks
William Morris Kinnersley
William Nicol (geologist)
William Nierenberg
William P. Winfree
William Penney, Baron Penney
William Prager
William R. Bennett, Jr.
William R. Kanne
William Rarita
William Richard Peltier
William Ritchie (physicist)
William Rowan Hamilton
William Shockley
William Stanley, Jr.
William Sturgeon
William Sutherland (physicist)
William Thomson, 1st Baron Kelvin
William Vermillion Houston
William Watson (scientist)
William Wootters
William Zisman
Willibald Jentschke
Willis Lamb
Williwaw
Willy Fischler
Willy Ley
Wilson loop
Wimshurst machine
Wind
WindPRO
WindShear
Wind Shear's Full Scale, Rolling Road, Automotive Wind Tunnel
Wind chill
Wind energy
Wind energy software
Wind farm
Wind generator
Wind gradient
Wind power
Wind power forecasting
Wind resource assessment
Wind shear
Wind speed
Wind stress
Wind tunnel
Wind turbine
Wind turbine aerodynamics
Wind wave
Wind wave model
Windage
Windbelt
Windhexe
Windographer
Windrow
Windward and leeward
Winfried Otto Schumann
Wing
Wing-shape optimization
Wing configuration
Wing fence
Wing loading
Wing twist
Wing warping
Wingspan
Wingsuit flying
Wingtip device
Wingtip vortices
Winston E. Kock
Winston H. Bostick
Wire chamber
Wireless energy transfer
Wireless telegraphy
Wiswesser's rule
Witelo
Witold Milewski (mathematician)
Witold Nazarewicz
Witten index
Wlodzimierz Klonowski
Wojciech H. Zurek
Wojciech Rubinowicz
Wojciech Świętosławski
Woldemar Voigt
Wolf Prize in Physics
Wolf effect
Wolf summation
Wolff algorithm
Wolfgang Demtröder
Wolfgang Eisenmenger (physicist)
Wolfgang Finkelnburg
Wolfgang Gentner
Wolfgang Haack
Wolfgang K. H. Panofsky
Wolfgang Ketterle
Wolfgang Ludwig Krafft
Wolfgang Paul
Wolfgang Pauli
Wolfgang Rindler
Wolfgang Smith
Wollaston landscape lens
Wollaston prism
Wolter telescope
Womersley number
Woo Chia-wei
Woodruff T. Sullivan III
Woodstock of physics
Woods–Saxon potential
Work (electrical)
Work (physics)
Work (thermodynamics)
Work function
Work output
Working Group on Women in Physics
World Data Center
World Magnetic Model
World Year of Physics 2005
World crystal
World line
Worldsheet
Worm-like chain
Wormhole
Wow! signal
Wright brothers
Wrinkles in Time
Wu Youxun
Wubbo Ockels
Wurtzite crystal structure
Wu–Yang monopole
Wyckoff positions
Wyld diagrams
Władysław Natanson
Władysław Turowicz
Włodzimierz Trzebiatowski
Włodzimierz Trzebiatowski Institute of Low Temperature and Structure Research

Indexes of physics articles